Christopher Howarth (born 23 May 1986) is an English footballer who plays as a goalkeeper.

After gaining the distinction of England schoolboy honours in 2001, this tall and agile player was signed up by his local club Bolton under the Academy scholarship scheme where he would spend three years under the supervision of the youth coaching team.

He was given a four-year professional contract in 2005 as the understudy to more senior keepers at Bolton such as Jussi Jääskeläinen, Ian Walker and Ali Al Habsi.

In January 2006, Howarth joined Stockport County on a month-long loan, but returned to Bolton without any first team experience. Howarth was linked with a season-long loan move to St Johnstone in July 2006, but after a trial the Saints dropped their interest in Howarth. In the beginning of the 2006/2007 season Howarth joined Oldham Athletic on a month-long loan, making his debut in a game against Swansea City, saving a penalty taken by Swansea icon Lee Trundle. He has since returned to The Reebok. On 22 March 2007 Horwarth joined Carlisle United on loan until the end of the 2006–07 season after Tony Williams' loan move to Wrexham.

On 7 May 2007, Howarth signed for Carlisle United on a two-year contract.

Two days before the 2009/10 season he signed for Droylsden, He was number two behind Craig Mawson but became the club's main Keeper when Mawson was released. He then signed for Welsh club Rhyl in the summer of 2010, before moving to Garry Flitcroft's Chorley in March 2011. He joined Salford City in October 2011.

References

External links
BBC profile 

Rhyl FC Website

1986 births
Living people
Footballers from Bolton
English footballers
Association football goalkeepers
Bolton Wanderers F.C. players
Stockport County F.C. players
Oldham Athletic A.F.C. players
Carlisle United F.C. players
Droylsden F.C. players
Rhyl F.C. players
Chorley F.C. players
Salford City F.C. players
English Football League players
Cymru Premier players
Northern Premier League players